Sphegina rufa is a species of hoverfly in the family Syrphidae.

Distribution
United States.

References

Eristalinae
Insects described in 1922
Taxa named by John Russell Malloch
Diptera of North America